The 2011 Season is the 99th season of competitive soccer in Canada.

National teams 
The home team or the team that is designated as the home team is listed in the left column; the away team is in the right column.

Men

Senior

Friendly matches

2011 CONCACAF Gold Cup

Under-20

Under-17

Women

Senior 
2011 FIFA Women's World Cup

Managerial changes

League tables

Men

Major League Soccer

North American Soccer League

Canadian Soccer League

Premier Development League 

With two new franchises (WSA Winnipeg and Hamilton Rage) being added, the Canadian content in this US league has increased to nine teams.

Women

W-League

Canadian clubs in international competitions

References 

 
Seasons in Canadian soccer